Tiranniemai (Greek: Τυραννιέμαι; English: I'm suffering) is an EP, which was released on 20 July 2012 by Sony Music Greece and Vanilla Ltd as a covermount with Tiletheatis, a weekly magazine. It's a CD+DVD set. The CD included 4 new songs and 2 remixes and the DVD 2 video clips.

Release and promotion
The album was released on 20 July 2012 as a covermount with Τiletheatis.

Track listing

CD

DVD

Access All Areas
Tracks 1 - 4 were included on the greatest hits album Access All Areas which was released in December 2012, to celebrate 40 years of Vissi's career.

Personnel
Nikos Karvelas – producer, orchestration, music, lyrics, backing vocals
Anna Vissi- producer, orchestration, vocals
Christos Alexakis - programming, orchestration, keyboards
Giannis Kifonidis - programming, keyboards, sound, mix
Stelios Fragkos - guitars
Tasos Faitos - bass
Serafim Yannakopoulos - drums
Christos Bousdoukos - harmonica

2012 EPs
Anna Vissi EPs